Joanes Urkixo Beitia (born 11 June 1955) is a Basque language writer, and film and television writer.

Life 
Urkixo was born in Bilbao. He studied Basque philology at the University of Deusto. He worked as a professor of Basque and Spanish and as a translator and adapter of films and series (in Basque and Spanish). Between 1978 and 1980 he collaborated with the literary group Pott banda, of which were members Bernardo Atxaga, Joxemari Iturralde, and Joseba Sarrionandia. 
In 1983, he created the literary magazine Tua-ttua along with Laura Mintegi.

He has also contributed to various newspapers and magazines, including Euskadi Sioux, Anaitasuna, Pott, Argia, Susa, Egunkaria and Zehar.

In 2003 he was the winner of the V Abril Prize, given by Associate Editors, with his work Gerlari zuria (White War).

Works

Narratives 
 Elur gainean (1984, Erein)
 Lurra deika (1991, Erein)

Poetry 
Berbak legezko aiztoak (1990, Susa)

Children's literature 
 Patxi Trumoik letrak ikasi nahi ditu (1985, Erein)
 Patxi eta txoriaren bahiketa (1986, Erein)
 Shangai Tom espazioko zaindari (1992, Elkar)
 Bihotz ausarta (1996, Zubia)
 Thule (1998, Elkarlanean)
 Zeruak erori zirenekoa (1998, Ibaizabal)
 Lur izeneko oihana (2000, Zubia)
 Gerlari zuria (2003, Elkar)
 Argitxo Santageda egunean (2003, Ikastolen Federakundea)
 Argitxo iratxoa (2003, Ikastolen Federakundea)
 Argitxo eta Olentzero (2003, Ikastolen Federakundea)
 Argitxo Sanjuanetan (2003, Ikastolen Federakundea)
 Nerabeak eta beste munstro batzuk (2005, Aizkorri)

Theater 
 Eta beharbada ispilu beltz bat (1981, BAK)

With other authors 
 Cuentos Incombustibles II (1982, Bilboko Liburusaltzaileen Elkartea)
 Lore Kontu-Kontu Lore (1985, Ondarroako Kultur Etxea)
 Bilbao ipuin biltegia (2000, Bilboko Udala)
 Bilbao lerrorik lerro (2001, Bilboko udala)
 Bilbo inguruko ipuinak = Cuentos alrededor de Bilbao (2013, Bizkaiko Foru Adundia, Kultura Saila)

Translations 
 Richard II (1985, Antzerti)
 SOS Lusitania (2016, Harriet)
 Autobusa berriro bera gabe abiatu zen egunekoa (2017, Harriet)
 Hegoak Astinduz (2017, Harriet)
 Wounded (2017, Harriet)
 Inozoen errua (2017, Harriet)

References 

1955 births
Living people